The 2016 Calder Cup playoffs were held from April 20 to June 11, 2016, to determine the season champion of the American Hockey League (AHL). The 16 teams that qualified, eight from each conference, played best-of-five series in the division semifinals, then best-of-seven series for the division finals, conference finals, and Calder Cup finals. In the finals, the Lake Erie Monsters defeated the Hershey Bears in a four-game sweep to win the Calder Cup for the first time in franchise history. It was the 10th time the Calder Cup was won by a team representing Cleveland, as the Cleveland Barons won nine titles during their history (1937–1973).

Playoff seeds
After the 2015–16 AHL regular season, 16 teams qualified for the playoffs. The top four teams in each division ranked by points percentage (points earned divided by points available) qualify for the 2016 Calder Cup Playoffs, with one exception in each conference: if the fifth-place team in the Atlantic or Central Division finishes with a better points percentage than the fourth-place team in the North or Pacific Division, it would cross over and compete in the other division's bracket.

At the end of the regular season, the following teams qualified (with points percentage):

Eastern Conference

Atlantic Division
 Hershey Bears – 98 points (.645)
 Providence Bruins – 95 points (.625)
 Wilkes-Barre/Scranton Penguins – 92 points (.605)
 Portland Pirates –  90 points (.592)
 Bridgeport Sound Tigers – 87 points (.572)

North Division
 Toronto Marlies – 114 points (.750)
 Albany Devils – 102 points (.671)
 Utica Comets – 88 points (.579)

Western Conference

Central Division
 Milwaukee Admirals – 101 points (.664)
 Lake Erie Monsters – 97 points (.638)
 Rockford IceHogs – 94 points (.618)
 Grand Rapids Griffins – 90 points (.592)

Pacific Division
 Ontario Reign – 93 points (.684)
 San Diego Gulls – 84 points (.618)
 Texas Stars – 91 points (.599)
 San Jose Barracuda – 73 points (.537)

Bracket

Division semifinals

Eastern Conference

(A1) Hershey Bears vs. (A4) Portland Pirates 
{{NHLPlayoffs
|team1=Hershey Bears
|team2=Portland Pirates
|stadium1=Giant Center
|stadium2=Cross Insurance Arena
|date1=April 22
|home1=2
|score1=6 – 4
|recap1=theahl.com/stats/game-summary.php?game_id=1015820
|won1=2
|1-1-1=19:46 – Ryan Stanton (1)
|1-1-2=Kyle Rau (1) – 6:11Rob Schremp (1) – 18:04
|1-2-1=15:49 – Jakub Vrana (1)
|1-2-2=Brett Olson (1) – 14:08
|1-3-1=7:49 – Tyler Lewington (1)15:14 – Tyler Lewington (2)
|1-3-2=Shane Harper (1) – 3:12Rob Schremp (2) – 3:23Shane Harper (2) – pp – 19:50
|goalie1-1=Dan Ellis 26 saves / 32 shots
|goalie1-2=Mike McKenna 28 saves / 32 shots
|date2=April 23
|home2=2
|score2=1 – 3
|recap2=theahl.com/stats/game-summary.php?game_id=1015821
|won2=1
|2-1-1=No scoring
|2-1-2=No scoring
|2-2-1=1:41 – Garrett Mitchell (1)
|2-2-2=Sena Acolatse (1) – 18:02
|2-3-1=1:31 – pp – Riley Barber (1)8:07 – Jakub Vrana (2)
|goalie2-1=Justin Peters 31 saves / 32 shots
|goalie2-2=Mike McKenna 18 saves / 21 shots
|date3=April 28
|home3=1
|score3=1 – 2
|ot3=3
|recap3=theahl.com/stats/game-summary.php?game_id=1015822
|won3=2
|3-1-1=No scoring|3-1-2=No scoring|3-2-1=Nathan Walker (1) – 5:27
|3-3-2=6:28 – Greg McKegg (1)
|3-4-2=3:10 – Rob Flick (1)
|goalie3-1=Justin Peters 42 saves / 44 shots
|goalie3-2=Mike McKenna 41 saves / 42 shots
|date4=April 30
|home4=1
|score4=2 – 0
|recap4=theahl.com/stats/game-summary.php?game_id=1015823
|won4=1
|4-1-1=Travis Boyd (1) – 12:51Chris Bourque (1) – pp – 16:23
|4-1-2=No scoring|goalie4-1=Justin Peters 19 saves / 19 shots
|goalie4-2=Mike McKenna 26 saves / 28 shots
|date5=May 1
|home5=1
|score5=2 – 1
|recap5=theahl.com/stats/game-summary.php?game_id=1015824
|won5=1
|5-1-1=Sean Collins (1) – 14:19
|5-1-2=No scoring|5-2-1=Ryan Stanton (2) –  8:29
|5-3-2=2:51 – Wayne Simpson (1)
|goalie5-1=Justin Peters 23 saves / 24 shots
|goalie5-2=Mike McKenna 21 saves / 23 shots
|series=Hershey wins series 3–2
}}

 (A2) Providence Bruins vs. (A3) Wilkes-Barre/Scranton Penguins 

 (N1) Toronto Marlies vs. (A5) Bridgeport Sound Tigers 

 (N2) Albany Devils vs. (N3) Utica Comets 

 Western Conference 

 (C1) Milwaukee Admirals vs. (C4) Grand Rapids Griffins 

 (C2) Lake Erie Monsters vs. (C3) Rockford IceHogs 

 (P1) Ontario Reign vs. (P4) San Jose Barracuda 

 (P2) San Diego Gulls vs. (P3) Texas Stars 

 Division finals 
 Eastern Conference 
 (A1) Hershey Bears vs. (A3) Wilkes-Barre/Scranton Penguins 

 (N1) Toronto Marlies vs. (N2) Albany Devils 

 Western Conference 
 (C2) Lake Erie Monsters vs. (C4) Grand Rapids Griffins 

 (P1) Ontario Reign vs. (P2) San Diego Gulls 

 Conference finals 
 Eastern Conference 
 (N1) Toronto Marlies vs. (A1) Hershey Bears 

 Western Conference 
 (P1) Ontario Reign vs. (C2) Lake Erie Monsters 

 Calder Cup Finals 
 Hershey Bears vs. Lake Erie Monsters 

Playoff statistical leaders
Leading skaters

These are the top ten skaters based on points. If there is a tie in points, goals take precedence over assists.GP = Games played; G = Goals; A = Assists; Pts = Points; +/– = Plus-minus; PIM = Penalty minutes Leading goaltenders 

This is a combined table of the top five goaltenders based on goals against average and the top five goaltenders based on save percentage with at least 180 minutes played. The table is initially sorted by goals against average, with the criterion for inclusion in bold.GP = Games played; W = Wins; L = Losses; SA = Shots against; GA = Goals against; GAA = Goals against average; SV% = Save percentage; SO = Shutouts; TOI = Time on ice (in minutes)''

References

External links
AHL official site

Calder Cup playoffs
Calder Cup Playoffs